AN/TPS-72 is a planar array, E\F band air search radar based on AN/TPS-43 and produced by Westinghouse.

See also
AN/TPS-43

External links
AN/TPS-72 @ US Dynamics

Military radars of the United States
Ground radars
Radars of the United States Air Force